Ralph Barnes was the Archdeacon of Totnes from 1775 until 1820. He died in his 89th year at Harberton on Saturday 20 May 1820. His son George was later Archdeacon of Barnstaple.

References

Archdeacons of Totnes
1820 deaths
Year of birth missing